Hornyak or Hornyák is a surname. Derived from Slovak/Czech Horňák and Ukrainian Горняк, it originally referred to a mountain dweller in Slavic languages. Its counterpart, Dolňák or Dolniak, means "valley dweller." Notable people with the surname include:

Ágnes Hornyák (born 1982), Hungarian handball player
Allan Hornyak (born 1951), American basketball player
Augustine Hornyak (1919–2003), Ukrainian Christian religious leader
Dóra Hornyák (born 1992), Hungarian handball player
Jennifer Hornyak (born 1940), Canadian artist
Zsolt Hornyák (born 1973), Slovak footballer

See also
 
Hornak

Hungarian-language surnames
Slovak-language surnames
Ukrainian-language surnames